is a Japanese politician, businessman and the governor of Okayama Prefecture in Japan.

Career 
Ibaragi replaced his father, Ibara Kiichi, as president and representative director of Tenmaya. He has been company president for 14 years.

Ibaragi took office as Okayama Prefectural Governor in November 2012.

References 

1966 births
Living people
People from Okayama Prefecture
University of Tokyo alumni
Governors of Okayama Prefecture